Fang Zhuangyou (1902 – 1970), courtesy name Xin'an, was a Chinese historian who was a professor at Wuhan University, and best known for studying Chinese ethnic history and the history of Song, Liao, Jin and Yuan Empires.

Biography
Fang was born Fang Zhangxiu in Fenshui Township, Hunan, Qing Empire, in 1902. After graduating from Hunan First Normal University, he was accepted to Beijing Normal University, and transferred to the Institute of Chinese Classics of Tsinghua University two years later. In 1929, he pursued advanced studies at the University of Tokyo, studying history under the direction of Shiratori Kurakichi. He taught at universities and colleges in both cities of Beijing and Nanjing after returning to China. He later went to the University of Paris in France to follow the sinologist Paul Pelliot study the history of oriental nationalities.

In 1936, Fang joined the faculty of Wuhan University, and taught there until 1949.

He was appointed director of the Hubei Provincial Bureau of Culture in 1955, and subsequently researcher of Hubei Institute of Philosophy and Social Sciences in 1958. He was chosen as deputy director of the Hubei Provincial Commission for the Administration of Cultural Relics in 1965.

Fang died in Wuhan, Hubei, in 1970.

Personal life 
Fang's son, Fang Keli (1938–2020), was a Chinese New Confucian philosopher.

Publications

Translation

References

Bibliography
 

1902 births
1970 deaths
People from Xiangtan
People's Republic of China historians
Academic staff of Wuhan University
Hunan First Normal University alumni
Beijing Normal University alumni
Tsinghua University alumni
University of Tokyo alumni
University of Paris alumni